Hanimaadhoo International Airport is an airport located on the island of Hanimaadhoo in Haa Dhaalu Atoll, Maldives, opened as a domestic airport. It was upgraded to an international airport on 2 February 2012, with the introduction of direct flights to Thiruvananthapuram in India by Maldivian. As of June 2019, it is one of three international airports in the Maldives.

Facilities
A huge airport expansion project was announced in 2021 with the line of credit facility from Export Import Bank of India.

Airlines and destinations

References

External links
 
 

Airports in the Maldives